Ikililou Dhoinine (born 14 August 1962) is a Comorian politician who was the President of the Comoros from 2011 to 2016; he was a Vice-President of Comoros from 2006 to 2011.

Political career
Dhoinine won the 2010 Comorian presidential election, in which he received the most votes in the first round (28.19%). He faced Mohamed Said Fazul and Abdou Djabir in a run-off election and received 61.12% to win the Presidency. A member of the ruling party, Dhoinine was supported in the election by incumbent President Ahmed Abdallah Mohamed Sambi. Previously, he had worked in the Ministry of Finance as the Vice-President in charge of Budget and Women's Entrepreneurship. From 26 March to 31 March 2008, he was the provisional President of Anjouan, an island in the Comoros.

Dhoinine, a pharmacist by training, is the first President of Comoros from the island of Mohéli.

Dhoinine served for five years as deputy to outgoing president Ahmed Abdallah Mohamed Sambi.

At his inauguration Dhoinine pledged to "stop at nothing in the fight against corruption". He initiated the National Commission for the Prevention and Fight Against Corruption and the Regulatory Authority for Public Procurement to increase transparency.

Dhoinine's wife is Hadidja Abubacarr I'Dhoinine, the former First Lady of Comoros.

References

External links

|-

1962 births
Living people
People from Mohéli
Presidents of the Comoros
Vice-presidents of the Comoros
Finance ministers of the Comoros
Politicians convicted of embezzlement